The Puente Nuevo ("New Bridge") is the newest and largest of three bridges that span the  chasm that carries the Guadalevín River and divides the city of Ronda, in southern Spain. Completed in 1793, the architect was José Martin de Aldehuela and the chief builder was Juan Antonio Díaz Machuca.

The construction of the newest bridge (the one standing as of 2017) was started in 1759 and took 34 years. There is a chamber above the central arch that was used for a variety of purposes, including as a prison. During the 1936–1939 civil war both sides allegedly used the prison as a torture chamber for captured opponents, killing some by throwing them from the windows to the rocks at the bottom of the El Tajo gorge. The chamber is entered through a square building that was once the guard-house. It now contains an exhibition describing the bridge's history and construction.

Construction of the previous bridge started in 1735; this was the first attempt to span the gorge at this height. The architects Jose Garcia and Juan Camacho completed the bridge with a single arch design. This bridge was quickly and poorly built; the entire bridge collapsed in 1741, killing 50 people.

See also
 Puente Viejo
 Ronda
 Guadalevín

References

External links
 Ronda Today English language tourist Information about Ronda and surrounding areas.

Nuevo
Nuevo
Road bridges in Spain
1793 establishments in Spain